Survivor 43 is the forty-third season of the American reality television series Survivor. The show was filmed from May 2 through May 27, 2022, in Fiji, for an eleventh consecutive season; it premiered on September 21, 2022 on CBS in the United States, and on Global in Canada. The season concluded on December 14, 2022; Mike Gabler was named the winner of the season, defeating Cassidy Clark and Owen Knight in a 7–1–0 vote. Gabler, aged 51, was the second oldest winner, after Bob Crowley, who was 57 years old at the time of winning Survivor: Gabon. Gabler has stated he intends on donating the one million dollar prize to charity.

Production 

On March 9, 2022, CBS renewed Survivor for its forty-third and forty-fourth seasons. Like the previous two seasons, Survivor 43 was contested over 26 days, being shortened from the traditional 39 days due to the COVID-19 pandemic. CBS required all cast and production members to be fully vaccinated. Filming began in May 2022.

It was initially broadcast from September 21 to  December 14, 2022 on CBS and the Global Television Network.

Contestants
The cast was announced on August 31, 2022, and consists of 18 new players divided into three tribes: Baka, Coco, and Vesi. The tribe for merged players was called Gaia, a name suggested by contestant Cassidy Clark. Among the contestants was Paralympic 100 meters runner Noelle Lambert.

Season summary

Episodes

Voting history

Notes

Reception
Winner Mike Gabler's 7–1–0 victory, as well as his intention to donate the winnings to veterans in need, was seen as shocking by many, including EW's Dalton Ross and GameRant's Jillian Unrau.

Viewing figures

United States

References

External links 
 

43
2022 American television seasons
2022 in Fiji
Television shows filmed in Fiji
Television shows set in Fiji